Events in the year 2019 in Namibia.

Incumbents
President: Hage Geingob
Vice President: Nangolo Mbumba
Prime Minister: Saara Kuugongelwa
Chief Justice: Peter Shivute

Events

Deaths

14 January – Peter Nambundunga, military officer (b. 1947).
8 February – Hanno Rumpf, politician and diplomat (b. 1958).
26 March - Immanuel Kauluma Elifas

References

 
2010s in Namibia
Years of the 21st century in Namibia
Namibia
Namibia